Stefan Jevtoski (born 2 September 1997) is a Macedonian footballer who plays as a midfielder for Újpest FC.

Career
In January 2016, Jevtoski signed a three-year contract with Bulgarian club Lokomotiv Plovdiv. He made his competitive debut on 29 November against Montana in which he came on in the 81st minute for Dani Kiki. His first goal came on 12 May 2017 against Levski Sofia when he joined from the bench in the 54th minute and scored the final goal for the 2–1 win. On 15 August 2017, Jevtoski's contract was terminated by mutual consent. He currently plays for NK Varazdin in the Croatian second league and made his debut against NK Lucko in 1:0 win. In July 2018, Jevtoski moved to Arsenal Kyiv on a free transfer. He made his league debut for the club on 29 July 2018, playing all 90 minutes in a 3-0 away defeat to Shakhtar Donetsk.

International career

Youth levels
Jevtoski made his debut for Macedonia U21 on 28 March 2017 in a friendly match against Bulgaria U21.

Statistics

Club

References

External links
 

1997 births
Living people
Footballers from Skopje
Macedonian footballers
North Macedonia youth international footballers
North Macedonia under-21 international footballers
FK Metalurg Skopje players
PFC Lokomotiv Plovdiv players
NK Varaždin players
FC Arsenal Kyiv players
FK Rabotnički players
First Professional Football League (Bulgaria) players
First Football League (Croatia) players
Ukrainian Premier League players
Macedonian First Football League players
Macedonian expatriate footballers
Macedonian expatriate sportspeople in Bulgaria
Expatriate footballers in Bulgaria
Macedonian expatriate sportspeople in Croatia
Expatriate footballers in Croatia
Association football midfielders
Macedonian expatriate sportspeople in Ukraine
Expatriate footballers in Ukraine
Újpest FC players
Nemzeti Bajnokság I players
Macedonian expatriate sportspeople in Hungary
Expatriate footballers in Hungary